FURPS is an acronym representing a model for classifying software quality attributes (functional and non-functional requirements):

 Functionality - Capability (Size & Generality of Feature Set), Reusability (Compatibility, Interoperability, Portability), Security (Safety & Exploitability)
 Usability (UX) - Human Factors, Aesthetics, Consistency, Documentation, Responsiveness
 Reliability - Availability (Failure Frequency (Robustness/Durability/Resilience), Failure Extent & Time-Length (Recoverability/Survivability)), Predictability (Stability), Accuracy (Frequency/Severity of Error)
 Performance - Speed, Efficiency, Resource Consumption (power, ram, cache, etc.), Throughput, Capacity, Scalability
 Supportability (Serviceability, Maintainability, Sustainability, Repair Speed) - Testability, Flexibility (Modifiability, Configurability, Adaptability, Extensibility, Modularity), Installability, Localizability

The model, developed at Hewlett-Packard was first publicly elaborated by Grady and Caswell. FURPS+ is now widely used in the software industry. The + was later added to the model after various campaigns at HP to extend the acronym to emphasize various attributes.

See also 
 Types of requirements
 Expanded list of types of requirements

Further reading

External links 
 IBM on Furps+

Software requirements
Mnemonics